Larry P. v. Riles was a court case filed in the Federal District in 1971, which was settled in 1979 and upheld on appeal in 1984. The case has been described as "arguably the most well-known legal decision related to cognitive assessment".

Five African-American children had been placed in special classes for the "educable mentally retarded", based on low IQ test scores. The case was filed by the National Association for the Advancement of Colored People (NAACP) Legal Defense fund. Judge Robert F. Peckham ruled that they had been wrongly placed. "Larry P." was one of the children, real name Darryl Lester. Wilson Riles was the California State Superintendent of Public Instruction.

The appeal court further banned the use of IQ tests on African-American children.

In a later case, Crawford v. Honig, African-American children were permitted to take IQ tests if their parents permitted it.

References

United States District Court for the Northern District of California cases